Interleukin-12 receptor, beta 1, or IL-12Rβ1 in short, is a subunit of the interleukin 12 receptor and the interleukin 23 receptor. IL12RB1, is the name of its human gene.  IL-12Rβ1 is also known as CD212 (cluster of differentiation 212).

The protein encoded by this gene is a type I transmembrane protein that belongs to the hemopoietin receptor superfamily.

This protein binds to interleukin-12 (IL-12) with a low affinity, and is part of the IL-12 receptor complex. This protein forms a disulfide-linked oligomer, which is required for its IL-12 binding activity. The coexpression of this and IL-12Rβ2 protein was shown to lead to the formation of high-affinity IL-12 binding sites and reconstitution of IL-12 dependent signaling. 

IL-12Rβ1 can also bind interleukin-23 (IL-23) as part of the IL-23 receptor complex. This complex forms a disulfide-linked oligomer, which is required for its IL-23 binding activity. The coexpression of this and IL-23R protein was shown to lead to the formation of IL-23 binding sites.

Various mutations in this gene were found to result in the immunodeficiency of patients with severe mycobacterial and Salmonella infections. Two alternatively spliced transcript variants of this gene encoding distinct isoforms have been reported.

All mutations known in the IL12RB1 gene, as well as many polymorphisms, have been collected in a mutation database

References

Further reading

External links
 

Clusters of differentiation